Lake Parz is a small lake located in the Dilijan National Park east of Dilijan in Armenia.
The lake was formed by natural climatic changes. "Parz" in Armenian means clear.

In 2017 the TransCaucasian Trail was created to connect Parz Lake with the town of Dilijan and in the opposite direction with Gosh Village and Gosh Lake. The trail was created through the building of new trail segments to connect existing trails or dirt roads together. 

In 2018 Trails For Change NGO has built a new trail that loops around the Lake. 

A restaurant with bar, paddle boats ropes course and zip lines are found around the lake.

Gallery

See also 
Lake Sevan
Dilijan National Park

References

Parz
Geography of Tavush Province